Rickshaws are used in numerous cities in the United States, primarily for their novelty value as an entertaining form of transportation for tourists and locals.  However, they also have environmental benefits and may be quicker than other forms of transport if traffic congestion is high.  Various laws regulate their use in different cities.

Overview
The first known commercial use of pedicabs in North America occurred in 1962 at the Seattle World's Fair. San Diego and New York City each host hundreds of pedicabs; dozens of other United States cities also have pedicab services.

In New York, human powered transport is available as an environmentally friendly means of transit. Local residents in New York City, however, view pedicabs primarily as tourist vehicles due to their high fares and their drivers' aggressive sales pitches to pedestrians. At a rate of $5 plus $1 per block per person, a 20-block (one mile) pedicab ride for two people will cost $50. In a taxicab, the same ride would cost under $10. According to Peter Meitzler of New York's Manhattan Rickshaw Company, a passenger has an entirely different urban experience when one rides in a rickshaw. He says that he uses the word "rickshaw" in his company name because it is internationally known.

Pedicab availability

Pedicabs in operation

 Albuquerque, New Mexico
 Austin, Texas
 Baltimore, Maryland
 Bellingham, Washington
 Burlington, Vermont
 Boston, Massachusetts
 Charleston, South Carolina
 Charlotte, North Carolina
 Chicago, Illinois
 Chico, California
 Cincinnati, Ohio
 Columbus, Ohio
 Corvallis, Oregon
 Denver, Colorado
 Detroit, Michigan
 El Paso, Texas
 Eugene, Oregon
 Key West, Florida
 Fort Lauderdale, Florida
 Harrisburg, Pennsylvania
 Houston, Texas
 Indianapolis, Indiana
 Lawrence, Kansas
 Madison, Wisconsin
 Minneapolis, Minnesota
 Nashville, Tennessee
 New Orleans, Louisiana
 New York, New York
 Newport, Rhode Island
 Oklahoma City, Oklahoma
 Philadelphia, Pennsylvania
 Phoenix, Arizona
 Pittsburgh, Pennsylvania
 Portland, Maine
 Portland, Oregon
 Provincetown, Massachusetts
 Raleigh, North Carolina
 Rochester, New York
 Saint Paul, Minnesota
 Salt Lake City, Utah
 San Diego, California
 San Jose, California
 Santa Clara, California
 Santa Cruz, California
 Santa Fe, New Mexico
 Santa Monica, California
 Savannah, Georgia
 Seattle, Washington
 Tempe, Arizona
 Virginia Beach, Virginia
 Washington, DC

Where pedicabs are regulated
 Austin, Texas – Drivers are required to be licensed by city Ground Transportation department, driving and criminal background checks required. Companies must be registered with city and carry liability insurance.  Pedicabs must be registered, and inspected.
 Boston, Massachusetts – Boston Police Department regulates the proliferation of pedicabs. Pedicab companies and drivers must register with the city of Boston.
 Denver, Colorado – Companies are required to hold business, tax license and insurance and are subject to inspections by the Traffic Engineer. All drivers are required to obtain a pedal cab operators license from the Office of Excise and License. Pedal cabs are allowed to operate anywhere in Denver County except for certain daytime restrictions. Sport and event centers, such as Invesco Field and the Pepsi Center, set their own rules for where on the property pedal cabs can operate and usually restrict their access to working one entrance.
 Gainesville, Florida
 Indianapolis, Indiana
 Kansas City, Missouri – Companies are required to hold and annually renew business, tax license and insurance. All rickshaws are inspected annually by city inspector, required to display a carriage license with vehicle capacity. Drivers are required to obtain a carriage drivers license from the city department of licensing and registration, upon verification of drivers history check, criminal background check, and physical.
 Minneapolis, Minnesota – City ordinance requiring that companies pay annual licensing fee, carry insurance, set equipment standards, and also that hours and locations of operation and driver and passenger behavior are regulated.
 New York City
 Oklahoma City, Oklahoma – Companies are required to hold and annually renew business, tax license and insurance. All rickshaws are inspected annually by city inspector, required to display a carriage license with vehicle capacity. Drivers are required to obtain a carriage drivers license from the city department of licensing and registration, upon verification of drivers history check, criminal background check, and physical.
 Orlando, Florida – license to own and/or operate a pedicab must be obtained from the Orlando Police Department
 San Diego, California – license to own and operate are required, including background checks
 Santa Cruz, California – Drivers are licensed through the city's police department and must pass background checks as well as have current driver's license.   Companies must be registered with the city and carry liability insurance, and all vehicles must be registered and pass annual safety inspections.
 Tampa, Florida – City required permits
 Washington, DC – The city government has passed regulations through the District Department of Transportation.  They are filed under DCMR 18-1213.  Additionally, to operate on the National Mall, the National Park Service issues permits through their concessions department.  These currently cost $100 per year and have strict insurance and safety requirements.

Where pedicabs are prohibited
 Las Vegas, Nevada – banned from "The Strip," and effectively from Clark County, where drivers must carry insurance and may not charge fares

References

Human-powered vehicles
Vehicles for hire
Rickshaws
Transportation in the United States